Mandibularia nigriceps is a species of beetle in the family Cerambycidae, and the only species in the genus Mandibularia. It was described by Pic in 1925.

References

Saperdini
Beetles described in 1925